McCloskey is a surname of Irish origin, a variant of McCluskey. Notable people with the surname include:

McCloskey (baseball), a 19th-century baseball player
Bernard McCloskey, Northern Ireland judge
C. John McCloskey, Catholic priest and member of Opus Dei
Country McCloskey (fl. 1841–1850), American bare-knuckle boxer
Deirdre McCloskey (born 1942), American economist
Delamere Francis McCloskey (1897–1983), Canadian-born Los Angeles City Councilman
Frank McCloskey (1939–2003), Indiana politician
Gloria McCloskey (born 1935), All-American Girls Professional Baseball League player
Helen McCloskey, All-American Girls Professional Baseball League player
Henry John McCloskey (1925–2000), Australian moral philosopher 
Jack McCloskey (1925–2017), American basketball coach
John McCloskey (1810–1885), Catholic archbishop
Leigh McCloskey (born 1955), American actor
Mark and Patricia McCloskey, a married couple, both attorneys, involved in the St. Louis gun-toting controversy
Matthew McCloskey (1893–1973), Democratic Party fundraiser and US Ambassador to Ireland, father of Thomas McCloskey
Paul McCloskey (born 1979), Irish boxer
Pete McCloskey (born 1927), California politician
Robert McCloskey (1914–2003), American author and illustrator
Robert J. McCloskey (1922–1996), American statesman and ambassador
Thomas McCloskey (1924–2004), Philadelphia construction magnate, son of Matthew McCloskey
William George McCloskey (1823–1909), American Catholic Bishop

See also
McCloskey critique of economics
McCleskey v. Kemp
McCluskey
McCroskey